The men's pole vault event  at the 1992 European Athletics Indoor Championships was held in Palasport di Genova on 1 March.

Results

References

Results

Pole vault at the European Athletics Indoor Championships
Pole